Tan Si Lie (born 3 March 1989) is a Singaporean archer. He represented Singapore at the 2015 Southeast Asian Games.

2015 Southeast Asian Games
At the 2015 Southeast Asian Games he competed for his country in the Men's individual event, Men's team event, and Mixed team event.

Si Lie made it to the bronze medal matches of the events he entered in and won the men's individual bronze medal and men's team bronze medal.

References

1989 births
Living people
Singaporean sportspeople of Chinese descent
Singaporean male archers
Southeast Asian Games silver medalists for Singapore
Southeast Asian Games bronze medalists for Singapore
Southeast Asian Games medalists in archery
Archers at the 2018 Asian Games
Competitors at the 2013 Southeast Asian Games
Competitors at the 2015 Southeast Asian Games
Asian Games competitors for Singapore